Cameron Amir Sutton (born February 27, 1995) is an American football cornerback for the Detroit Lions of the National Football League (NFL). He played college football at Tennessee, and was drafted by the Pittsburgh Steelers in the third round of the 2017 NFL Draft.

Early years
Sutton attended Jonesboro High School in Jonesboro, Georgia. He played cornerback and wide receiver for the Cardinal football team and had 1,396 all-purpose yards and 19 touchdowns as a senior. He also played baseball and basketball in high school. Sutton was rated by Rivals.com as a three-star recruit. He committed to the University of Tennessee to play college football under head coach Butch Jones.

College career
Sutton started in all 12 games as a true freshman in 2013 and recorded 39 tackles, two interceptions, one sack, and a touchdown. He started all 13 games in the 2014 season, recording 37 tackles and three interceptions.

Professional career

Sutton received an invitation to the Senior Bowl and raised his draft stock after impressing scouts during practice and showing versatility and willingness for playing both safety and cornerback during the game. He helped the South secure a 16–15 victory over the North and led the team with four combined tackles. He attended the NFL Combine and completed nearly all of the combine drills, but opted to not perform the short shuttle. Sutton also participated in Tennessee's Pro Day and chose to run the short shuttle, three-cone drill, and perform positional drills for representatives and scouts in attendance. The majority of NFL draft experts and analysts projected Sutton to be drafted in the third round. He was ranked the 15th best cornerback in the draft by ESPN and NFLDraftScout.com.

The Pittsburgh Steelers selected Sutton in the third round (94th overall) of the 2017 NFL Draft. The Pittsburgh Steelers also drafted his teammate at Tennessee and the Senior Bowl, quarterback Joshua Dobbs.

Pittsburgh Steelers

2017
On June 13, 2017, the Pittsburgh Steelers signed Sutton to a four-year, $3.21 million contract that includes a signing bonus of $736,128.

He entered training camp competing with William Gay, Coty Sensabaugh, and Mike Hilton for a backup cornerback position. On September 4, 2017, the Steelers placed Sutton on injured reserve after he aggravated a hamstring injury during the Steelers' final preseason game against the Carolina Panthers.

Although Sutton wore jersey No. 20 throughout the preseason, he sold it to Robert Golden after newly acquired free agent Joe Haden bought Golden's No. 21 from him. Sutton opted to wear No. 34 for his rookie season.

On October 31, Sutton returned to practice for the first time since his injury. The Steelers had 21 days to decide whether to activate Sutton or keep him on the injured reserve list for the remainder of the season. On November 21, 2017, the Pittsburgh Steelers activated Sutton off injured reserve. On December 4, 2017, Sutton made his professional regular season debut after he replaced Coty Sensabaugh at left cornerback in the second half against the Cincinnati Bengals. Sensabaugh was pulled after Bengals' receiver A. J. Green made seven catches for 77 yards and two touchdowns in the first half. Sutton held Green to no catches and deflected a pass to help the Steelers overcome a 17-point deficit and defeat the Bengals 23–20. In Week 14, Sutton recorded two solo tackles in a 39–38 victory over the Baltimore Ravens. On December 17, 2017, he earned his first career start in place of Joe Haden, who was still recovering from a fractured fibula sustained in Week 10. In his first start, Sutton recorded a season-high three combined tackles in a 27–24 loss to the New England Patriots. Haden returned the following week and Sutton reverted to a reserve role for the last two games of the regular season. He finished his rookie season with five combined tackles (four solo) and a pass deflection in five games and one start.

2018
Sutton was able to revert to No. 20 after Robert Golden was released by the Steelers on March 14, 2018.

During the Week 1 opener at division rival Cleveland. Sutton made his first career interception off a pass by Browns quarterback Tyrod Taylor. In Week 5 against Atlanta, Sutton recorded a season-high five combined tackle in the Steelers' 41-17 blowout victory. A week later against Cincinnati, he made another five tackles and added a pass deflection as the Steelers won 28–21. Sutton's snaps would be diminished until Week 13 in a 17–10 win against the eventual Super Bowl Champion New England Patriots.

2019
Sutton's season started very quietly during the Steelers' slide to 1–4. In a Week 6 prime time game against the Los Angeles Chargers, Sutton Intercepted a pass off Philip Rivers and returned it for 26 yards to secure the victory. He would finish the night with one interception, three passes defensed, and once tackle, his best performance of the year. During the Steelers' 21–7 loss against the Cleveland Browns in Week 10, Sutton returned his first punt of the season for 8 yards. The Steelers finished the season with an 8–8 record, missing the playoffs for the second consecutive year.

2020
In Week 6 against the Cleveland Browns, Sutton recorded his first interception of the season off a pass thrown by Baker Mayfield during the 38–7 win.

2021
On March 20, 2021, the Steelers signed Sutton to a two-year, $9 million contract.

Detroit Lions
On March 16, 2023, Sutton was signed to a three-year, $33 million contract with the Detroit Lions.

References

External links
Tennessee Volunteers bio 

1995 births
Living people
People from Jonesboro, Georgia
Sportspeople from the Atlanta metropolitan area
Players of American football from Georgia (U.S. state)
American football cornerbacks
Tennessee Volunteers football players
Pittsburgh Steelers players
Detroit Lions players